Bergeria haematochrysia is a moth of the family Erebidae. It was described by Sergius G. Kiriakoff in 1952. It is found in Cameroon, Zambia and the Democratic Republic of the Congo.

References

Syntomini
Moths described in 1952
Insects of Cameroon
Insects of the Democratic Republic of the Congo
Fauna of Zambia
Erebid moths of Africa